The Battle of Ghunib was a siege of aul Gunib by the Russian forces in 1859.
After 25 years of resistance, Imam Shamil surrendered to the Russians. See Murid War#The end (1857-1859).

References

The Russian conquest of the Caucasus, John Frederick Baddeley, 1908

Battle of Ghunib
Conflicts in 1859
Caucasian War
Battles involving Chechnya
Battles involving Russia